Valakone Phomphakdy (18 June 1966 – 18 January 2020) was a Laotian professional footballer and  football manager. He played for Yotha F.C. from October 2004 until 2005 and from January until February 2011 he coached the Laos national football team.

On 18 January 2020, his current team EVO United announced his death on their Facebook page.

References

Living people
1966 births
Laos national football team managers
Yotha F.C. players

Association footballers not categorized by position
Laotian footballers
Laotian football managers